Giants in the Trees is an American rock band formed in Wahkiakum County, Washington, in 2017. The band was formed by former Nirvana bassist Krist Novoselic, who created the band as a local musical project. Novoselic, Jillian Raye, Erik Friend, and Ray Prestegard are the current band members of Giants in the Trees. Often, Jennifer Johnson joins on vocals.

History 
The band started by writing two songs in the first two days of playing together; "Sasquatch" and "Center of the Earth". "Sasquatch" was their first officially released song, in July 2017; it was released alongside a music video that Krist joked as "costing over 2 million U.S. dollars to produce."

Giants in the Trees' self-titled debut album was released in late 2017. The band's second album, Volume 2, was released on March 29, 2019.

Novoselic, Raye, and Johnson formed the supergroup 3rd Secret in 2022, alongside Soundgarden's Matt Cameron and Kim Thayil and Void's Bubba Dupree.

Discography
Giants in the Trees (2017)
Volume 2 (2019)

References

External links
 

Alternative rock groups from Washington (state)
2017 establishments in Washington (state)
Musical groups established in 2017